King Faisal Mosque may refer to:

 Faisal Mosque in Islamabad, Pakistan
 King Faisal Mosque, Sharjah, United Arab Emirates

See also 
 Faisal (disambiguation)
 King Faisal (disambiguation)

King Faisal Mosque